"Talking Out of Turn" is a 1981 single by the English progressive rock band the Moody Blues.  It was the third and final single released from their 1981 album Long Distance Voyager.

The song became a hit in the United States, reaching #65 on the Billboard Hot 100 and #60 Cash Box.  It did better in Canada, where it reached #27.

Written by bassist John Lodge, it lasts nearly seven and a half minutes, only five seconds short of "Nights in White Satin." It was later released as a single in November 1981, with "Veteran Cosmic Rocker" on the B-side.

Billboard called it a "soothingly melodic song highlighted by John Lodge's vocal."  Record World said that "space-age synthesizers introduce Justin Hayward's relaxed vocal" and commented on the "rich harmony choruses."  Allmusic critic Dave Connolly called it a "winning number."

The instrumental final minute of the song closes the first hour of The Mike Malloy Show each weekday evening.

Chart history

Personnel
 John Lodge – lead vocals, 12-string acoustic guitar, bass
 Justin Hayward – backing vocals and acoustic & electric guitars
 Ray Thomas – backing vocals
 Patrick Moraz – Polymoog, Yamaha CS80, vocoder and Minimoog
 Graeme Edge – drums, overdubbed cymbals and Simmons drums

References

External links
 

The Moody Blues songs
1981 singles
Songs written by John Lodge (musician)
1981 songs
Song recordings produced by Pip Williams